SFE may refer to:

 Sales force effectiveness
 San Fernando Airport (Philippines) IATA code
 Scottish Financial Enterprise
 Scouts for Equality
 Secure function evaluation
 Sigma Phi Epsilon
 Shannon-Fano-Elias coding, a lossless data compression algorithm
 Society of Fuse Engineers, designers of certain automotive fuses
 Solar flare effect
 SparkFun Electronics
 Spec-Files-Extra, a way to build common packages for OpenSolaris or OpenIndiana
 Stacking-fault energy
 Star-formation efficiency
 Supercritical fluid extraction
 Supplier-furnished equipment
 Surface free energy, often referred to as Surface energy
 Sydney Futures Exchange, now merged with the Australian Stock Exchange to become the Australian Securities Exchange
 The Encyclopedia of Science Fiction